Sir Charles Flower, 1st Baronet (1763–1834) was a merchant who served as Lord Mayor of London in 1808. Flower traded in salt meat, butter and cheese, and was described as having acquired "an ample fortune" by the time of his ascendency to the mayoralty. He was created a baronet, of the Flower baronets, of Lobb in the County of Oxford and of Woodford in the County of Essex, on 1 December 1809.

Flower was appointed an alderman in the City of London's Cornhill ward in 1801. He had previously been elected one of the Sheriffs of the City of London in 1799.

Flower was a liveryman of the Worshipful Company of Framework Knitters. Flower's daughter, Anne Mary, became a noted horticulturist in Canada.

References

1763 births
1834 deaths
Aldermen of the City of London
19th-century lord mayors of London
19th-century English politicians
Sheriffs of the City of London
Baronets in the Baronetage of the United Kingdom
English merchants